Zexel is a Japanese auto-components manufacturer. It was founded in 1939 as Diesel Kiki Co., Ltd., under a Bosch license, for domestic production of fuel-injection pumps for diesel engines. Originally established with an investment from Isuzu Motors Ltd., (a major Japanese manufacturer of engines for heavy-duty vehicles), this company was renamed ZEXEL Corp. in 1990.  Diesel-Kiki entered into a joint venture in the United States with Wynns Climate Systems to begin manufacturing automotive HVAC systems in approximately 1987.  The company was called Wynn-Kiki at the time and was the predecessor to ZEXEL USA.  The ZEXEL rebranding was a two-year project involving a worldwide name search and complete marketing strategy analysis.  The company logo featured red, white and blue colors picked to represent precision, technology and excellence.  A CD was distributed to employees featuring a new company theme song.  The name was compiled from the words zenith and excellence. The company is said to have reached the zenith of its performance under its old name of Diesel-Kiki, and has excelled well at customer satisfaction.  In their translation, it came out ZEXEL instead of ZEXCEL.

The company was reorganized as Bosch Automotive Systems Corp. and Valeo Japan in 2000 after Robert Bosch GmbH of Germany and Valeo of France bought majority shares in Zexel Corporation. The Zexel name is now a Bosch brand, but the assets were split between Bosch and Valeo.

Research and development
Since its inception as Diesel Kiki Ltd., the company has developed a number of products that exemplify Japanese automotive engineering quality. Because of the firm's sizeable research and development capacity, it was also involved in international environmental protection projects such as the reduction of ozone depleting substances, mitigation of smoke emissions, among others.

Ownership changes
Following the Bosch takeover, there was a series of ownership changes that resulted in the division of the major business groups: fuel injection pumps, automotive airconditioners, bus airconditioners and mobile refrigeration units, and the differential and airbag product lines. For example, M.C. Bernardo Inc. (the exclusive representative of Diesel Kiki/Zexel in the Philippines) had to turn over business to Robert Bosch Philippines, like other Zexel partners in other countries and regions.

Automotive airconditioners
Valeo of France bought the automotive airconditioner business, and refocused manufacturing to support the European market. The shift in focus was the reason why Zexel Automotive Climate Control Systems (ZACCS) stopped its operations providing products, unit prototyping and after-market services to Isuzu, Nissan, Nissan Diesel and Columbian Motors (a Kia assembler) in the Philippines.

Zexel's US operations were headquartered in Decatur, Il. and focused on A/C compressors for Saturn at that facility. The Texas facility produced evaporator assemblies, otherwise called cooling units, hook up tubes and condensers. Customers of that plant included Mazda, Subaru, Isuzu and Volvo.  The plant produced more than three thousand condensers per day and pioneered certain aspects of parallel flow condensor design and manufacturing.

Bus airconditioners and refrigeration
Thermo King bought into the bus airconditioner and refrigeration lines.

Differentials
The Torsen differential was purchased by Toyoda Machine Works Ltd. which eventually merged with another company to form JTEKT Torsen North America.

See also
 Pressure wave supercharger

References

External links 

Isuzu
Automotive companies of Japan
Japanese brands